Passiflora viridescens is a plant species native to Perú and Ecuador.

Passiflora viridescens is a woody liana climbing over other vegetation to a height of over 8 m. Leaves are broadly lanceolate to ovate, up to 14 cm long, forming three points at the tip in a W-shaped pattern. Flowers are up to 10 cm in diameter, light green with purple styles. Fruits are elliptical to egg-shaped, up to 6 cm long, green with minute hairs.

References

Flora of Ecuador
viridescens
Flora of Peru
Taxa named by Linda Katherine Escobar